Robert Baillie (4 July 1724 – 20 November 1806) was an Anglican priest in Ireland during the second half of the 18th century and the first decade of the 19th.

He was born in County Kilkenny and educated at Trinity College, Dublin. He was  Archdeacon of Cashel from 1790 until his death.

Brothers: Thomas Baillie (Royal Navy officer), William Baillie (engraver)

Notes

Alumni of Trinity College Dublin
Archdeacons of Cashel
18th-century Irish Anglican priests
19th-century Irish Anglican priests
People from County Kilkenny
1724 births
1806 deaths